The Dürre Wand (literally barren wall) is a mountain ridge in Lower Austria and belongs topographically to the  Gutenstein Alps. It stretches from Miesenbach in a WSW direction to the Schneeberg. 
The Dürre Wand is a ridge, rocky in places, which is bordered by pastures, forests and waterfalls. In contrast to Hohe Wand plateau in the immediate east, it culminates in a narrow ridge-line with its hiking trail offering outstanding views.

Elevations
The highest elevations are Katharinenschlag, Schober, Öhler and Plattenstein.

Refuge huts 
On Plattenstein sits the Gauermann Hut owned and run by the Austrian Tourist Club (Österreichischer Touristenklub) or ÖTK.

Caves
The Tabler Cave (Tablerhöhle, 1862/10) east of the Plattenstein and the Erzloch (1862/4), a shaft cave east of the  Öhler refuge hut, are two caves on the crest of the Dürre Wand. Other important caves are the Malepartuskluft (1862/19), Bergmilchkammer (1862/20), Marechle Cave (1862/21), Schichtkammer (1862/23) and the Vierpfeiler Cave (1862/24) (all in the Marecherkogel south of the Öhler near Puchberg am Schneeberg), the Zinsensteinhöhle (1862/11) and the Waldbodenloch (1862/61) (all in the north of  the Dürre Wand near Gutenstein). In all, exactly one hundred caves are recorded in the register for Region 1862 - Dürre Wand.

Gallery

Footnotes and references

External links

Gauermann Hut 
Öhler Hut 

Gutenstein Alps
Mountain ranges of Lower Austria